The 2018 IHF South and Central American Emerging Nations Championship was the 1st edition of this Handball event organized by the International Handball Federation. It was held in Palmira, Colombia at the Pabellon Blanco, from 22 to 28 October.

Group stage

Group A

All times are local (UTC–5).

Group B

Group C

Consolation round

Knockout stage

Bracket

5th place bracket

Quarterfinals

5–8th place semifinals

Semifinals

Seventh place game

Fifth place game

Third place game

Final

Final standing

References

External links
IHF website
Colombian Handball Federation website

IHF South and Central American Emerging Nations Championship
IHF South and Central American Emerging Nations Championship
IHF South and Central American Emerging Nations Championship
International handball competitions hosted by Colombia
South and Central America Handball Confederation competitions